Torab-e Sofla (also Romanized as Torāb-e Soflá; also known as Torāb-e Pā’īn) is a village in Rak Rural District, in the Central District of Kohgiluyeh County, Kohgiluyeh and Boyer-Ahmad Province, Iran. At the 2006 census, its population was 20, in 6 families.

References 

Populated places in Kohgiluyeh County